James Henderson (1797 – 12 September 1874) was a Scottish minister of the Free Church of Scotland who served as Moderator of the General Assembly to the Free Church 1855/56.

Early life and ministry

Henderson was born in Kelso on 4 February 1797 and was educated at Kelso Grammar School. He studied divinity at the University of Edinburgh. Then he studied under George Lawson at Selkirk Divinity Hall. After examination he was licensed by Presbytery of Selkirk.

He was ordained by the by Presbytery of Kelso, on 4 September 1821, to the Low Meeting, Berwick-upon-Tweed. On 27 November 1823 he translated to St Bernard's Church in Stockbridge, Edinburgh. On 21 February 1828 translated to Ratho Kirk. He lived in Ratho manse.

In 1832 he moved to St Enoch's Church in Glasgow, being presented by the Magistrates and Council 29 August, and admitted 
29 November 1832. He was awarded a doctorate D.D. by Glasgow University in 1837. He was then living at 29 Bath Street.

After the Disruption
In the Disruption of 1843 he left the Church of Scotland and joined the Free Church of Scotland. He was minister of St Enoch's Free Church from 1843-1874. A St Enoch's Free Church was built on Waterloo Street in Glasgow. He also played a role in the wider church being convener of the Foreign Mission Scheme of 
the Free Church. In 1855 he succeeded Rev James Grierson as Moderator of the General Assembly the highest position in the church. In 1856 he was succeeded in turn by Rev Thomas M'Crie.

He died in North Berwick on 12 September 1874.

After his death St Enoch's Free Church was known as the Melville Church after its next minister Rev Melville.

Family

He married twice: 
(1) 16 March 1826, Eleanor Rutherford (died 27 January 1841), daughter of James Russell, Professor of Clinical Surgery, University of Edinburgh, and had issue — 
Joseph, born 7 January, and died 18 April 1829
Eleanor Russell, born 27 September 1830, died 23 August 1840
James, merchant, Burma, born 18 June 1832, died 12 May 1904
John Joseph, born 15 March 1834, died 13 February 1837
Agnes, born 1836, died 26 February 1845
Archibald, D.D., United Free Church minister of Crieff, Moderator of United Free Assembly in 1909, Principal of U.F. College, Glasgow, 1918, born 9 August 1837
Francis, M.D., Glasgow, born 28 August 1838, died 15 May 1910

(2) 16 August 1854, Charlotte Margery (died s.p. 28 November 1885), daughter of James Reddie, solicitor, Glasgow.

Publications
Two occasional Sermons (Edinburgh, 1828; Glasgow, 1843)
Popery un-changed, the Creed of Pius IV. still the Creed of the Church of Rome
Lectures IV. (On the Social Condition of the People) 
VII. (On the Jews)
VIII. (On the Evidences of Revealed Religion)
I. (On Protestantism)

Bibliography
The Border Almanac, 1875

Artistic recognition
He was photographed in 1860 (illustrated right) at the foot of the steps to New College with several other ex-Moderators of the Free Church.

References
Citations

Sources

1797 births
1874 deaths
Alumni of the University of Edinburgh
19th-century Ministers of the Free Church of Scotland
19th-century Ministers of the Church of Scotland